This is a list of winners and nominations for the Tony Award for Best Scenic Design for outstanding set design of a play or musical. The award was first presented in 1947. In 1960, 1961, and since 2005, the category was divided into Scenic Design in a Play and Scenic Design in a Musical with each genre receiving its own award.

Winners and nominees

1940s

1950s

1960s

1970s

1980s

1990s

2000s

See also
 Tony Award for Best Scenic Design in a Musical
 Tony Award for Best Scenic Design in a Play
 Drama Desk Award for Outstanding Set Design
 Laurence Olivier Award for Best Set Design

External links
Tony Awards Official site
Tony Awards at Internet Broadway database Listing
Tony Awards at broadwayworld.com

Tony Awards
Awards established in 1947
1947 establishments in New York City
Tony Awards